is a 1981 Japanese film directed by Kinji Fukasaku and Koreyoshi Kurahara sequel of the film Seishun no mon Jiritsuhen was released in 1982.

It is based on a story by Hiroyuki Itsuki that was originally serialized in the magazine Shukan Gendai in 1969–70. The same story inspired a 1975 film of the same name as well as three separate television productions in 1976-77 (TBS), 1991 (TV Tokyo), and 2005 (TBS).

Plot
Ibuke Shinsuke is the son of a miner working at Chikuo coalfield at Mt. Kaharu northwest of Tagawa, Fukuoka. In 1938, his father Ibuki Juzo takes his lover Tae her from her patron Hanawa Ryugoro, boss of the Hanawa yakuza gang, and the two fight until Yabetora stops them. A while later Juzo and his team plan to fight Hanawa and his men until they hear that the mine has been flooded and Juzo orders everyone to assist in the rescue efforts. Juzo is killed in an attempt to blast part of a tunnel to save some Korean miners who had been by the company.

In 1944, Tae kicks Shinsuke out when he and his friends gang up on a Korean boy named Kumana so he later visits Kumana alone and challenges him to a duel that ends in a draw. Kumana's father Kanayama Shuretsu, whose real name is Kim Chu-ryol, tells Shinsuke and Tae that Juzo saved him in the mine collapse and gives them a large portion of meat as a gift. Tae develops feelings for Mr. Kanayama, who is drafted into the war.

When the war ends, the miners tie up a mine manager, who confesses that soldiers shot miners trying to escape from the collapse years earlier. Mr. Kanayama returns from the war and meets with Tae. Hanawa lets Shinsuke ride on the back of his Harley Davidson motorcycle with him, then gives Tae some money and invites them to live with him in Iizuka, but Tae refuses. She also rejects an offer to become the mistress of one of her superiors at the mine.

The Korean miners enter the mine office and demand equal pay to the Japanese miners. When the police are called in, a riot ensues. Hanawa, now owner of the mine, brings in additional men to fight the miners and Mr. Kanayama injures Mr. Hanezawa during the fight, then hides in Tae's house. When the other miners come to turn him in to the police, Tae gives him the gun that Juzo left for Shinsuke, allowing him to escape. Tae begins coughing up blood from working in the mine so Hanawa helps her and Shinsuke move to Iizuka, where he attends school and she is put in a hospital.

In 1950, Shinsuke is scouted by the baseball coach Mr. Hirano as he is about to enter high school. In 1952, Shinsuke's childhood friend Orie and her mother visit Tae in the hospital. Shinsuke arrives on a motorcycle given to him by Hanawa, but instead of letting Orie ride with him he takes his teacher Ms. Azusa to a record store in Hakata.

In 1953, Hanawa offers to marry Tae but she rejects his proposal. Ms. Azusa quits and returns to Tokyo. Shinsuke visits Orie where she is now working at a cabaret in Kokura. His motorcycle is stolen so he and Orie stay at a hotel where she sometimes brings clients and she takes his virginity, then encourages him to leave his past behind and go to university in Tokyo.

Hanawa is shot in the knee and his gang suspects that the Korean miners are responsible. Chota attacks them alone and shoots at them but is captured. Mr. Kanayama tells Hanawa and Shinsuke that the Koreans did not shoot Hanawa as the two take Chota back with them. Shinsuke decides to go to Tokyo and Tae dies that night. He writes a goodbye letter to Hanawa and rides away.

Cast
Bunta Sugawara as Ibuki Juzo
Keiko Matsuzaka as Ibuki Tae
Kōichi Satō as Ibuki Shinsuke
Kaoru Sugita as Maki Orie
Tomisaburo Wakayama as Hanawa Ryugoro
Kōji Tsuruta as Yabetora
Tsunehiko Watase as Kanayama
Junichi Ishida as Hirano
Ryunosuke Kaneda as Hanezawa
Kazuo Kato as Owner
Nenji Kobayashi as Chota
Aoi Nakajima as Hirai Kimiyo
Taeko Shinbashi as Maki Masae
Kantaro Suga as Ichimura
Saburô Tokitô as Haruo

References

External links
 

1981 films
1980s Japanese-language films
Films directed by Kinji Fukasaku
Films directed by Koreyoshi Kurahara
Films set in 1938
Films set in 1940
Films set in 1942
Films set in 1944
Films set in 1945
Films set in 1950
Films set in 1952
Films set in 1953
Films set in Fukuoka Prefecture
Films about mining
Yakuza films
1980s Japanese films